Abby Elliott is an American actress, comedian, and impressionist. Elliott is best known for her tenure as a cast member on the NBC sketch comedy series Saturday Night Live from 2008 to 2012. Since her departure from SNL, she has starred on the Bravo comedy Odd Mom Out and the NBC sitcom Indebted. She is the daughter of actor/comedian Chris Elliott and sister of Bridey Elliott.

Early life
Elliott was born in New York City, the elder of two children. She is the daughter of Paula Niedert, a talent coordinator, and actor/comedian Chris Elliott. Her grandfather was radio comedian Bob Elliott. Her younger sister is actress Bridey Elliott; they were both raised in Wilton, Connecticut. She attended high school at Immaculate High School in Danbury, Connecticut, where she acted in school plays and musicals. After graduating from Immaculate High School in 2005, she attended Marymount Manhattan College in New York City but dropped out during her first semester.

Career
Elliott took comedy classes at The Groundlings and eventually began training and performing in various sketch comedy shows at the Upright Citizens Brigade Theatre (UCB) in Los Angeles.

In 2006, Elliott appeared with supporting roles for the pilots You've Reached the Elliotts and Chrissy: Plain & Simple, both sitcoms that star her father, Chris Elliott. While at UCBT, she frequently performed with The Midnight Show sketch troupe. She has also occasionally performed comedy with her sister Bridey. Before joining the cast of SNL, Elliott had also done guest voices roles on King of the Hill and Minoriteam. She has also been featured in a number of Late Night with Jimmy Fallon sketches such as "Jersey Floor" and "Studio 6-Bee". Elliott made her film debut with a small role in No Strings Attached, and has since had supporting roles in the films High Road and Fun Size.

After leaving SNL in 2012, Elliott has made guest appearances on television programs such as 2 Broke Girls, How I Met Your Mother, Happy Endings, and Inside Amy Schumer. From 2015 to 2017, she co-starred on the Bravo series Odd Mom Out. In 2020, she starred in the Fran Drescher sitcom Indebted on NBC.

Saturday Night Live
Elliott joined the cast of SNL midway through the 2008–2009 season (season 34), in November 2008, following the departure of Amy Poehler. She is the third generation of her family to have been featured on SNL (the second to be hired as a cast member, and her tenure on the show was longer than both her father and grandfather). Her father, Chris Elliott, was an SNL cast member during the 1994–1995 season (season 20) and her grandfather, Bob Elliott, was one half of the popular comedy duo Bob & Ray. Bob Elliott co-starred on a Christmas episode in the 1978–1979 season (season 4).

After four seasons on SNL, Elliott was let go from the show prior to its 38th season.

Personal life
In 2010, Elliott dated fellow Saturday Night Live cast member Fred Armisen. They ended their relationship in September 2011.

Elliott married television writer Bill Kennedy on September 3, 2016. They have a daughter, Edith Pepper Kennedy.

Filmography

References

External links

21st-century American actresses
Actresses from Connecticut
Actresses from New York City
American film actresses
American impressionists (entertainers)
American sketch comedians
American television actresses
American voice actresses
American women comedians
Living people
Marymount Manhattan College alumni
People from Wilton, Connecticut
Comedians from New York City
Upright Citizens Brigade Theater performers
Comedians from Connecticut
21st-century American comedians
Year of birth missing (living people)